Sirajuddin Hamid Yousuf is a Sudanese diplomat and is the current Ambassador Extraordinary and Plenipotentiary of the Republic of Sudan to the Russian Federation, presenting his credentials to President of Russia Dmitry Medvedev on 16 January 2009.

Yousuf was elected as a member of the Sudanese National Assembly representing the constituency of Adila 78 of the state of southern Darfur and eventually presided over the Human Rights and Public Duties Committee of the Sudanese parliament.

Between 2001 and 2005, Yousuf served as the Ambassador of Sudan to Uganda, Burundi and Rwanda. Between 2006 and January 2008, Yousuf was the Director of the Department of Peace and Humanitarian Affairs, before being appointed as Director of the Crisis Management Department of the Sudan Ministry of Foreign Affairs.

Yousuf graduated from the University of Khartoum in April 1979, obtaining his master's degree (LL M) in International Law from the University of Pretoria (South Africa) in 2002.

See also
Russia–Sudan relations

References

1953 births
Living people
Ambassadors of Sudan to Russia
University of Pretoria alumni
Sudanese lawyers
Sudanese diplomats
Sudanese Muslims
University of Khartoum alumni